Gemmula chinoi is a species of sea snail, a marine gastropod mollusk in the family Turridae.

Description
The length of the shell varies between 12 mm and 21 mm.

Distribution
This marine species occurs off the Philippines.

Original description
  Stahlschmidt P., Poppe G.T. & Tagaro S.P. (2018). Descriptions of remarkable new turrid species from the Philippines. Visaya. 5(1): 5-64. page(s): 32, pl. 25 figs 1-2.

References

External links
 Worms Link

chinoi
Gastropods described in 2018